The 1992 European Super Cup was the 17th edition of the European Super Cup, an annual football match organized by UEFA (the Union of European Football Associations) and contested by the winners of the previous season's European Cup and Cup Winners' Cup competitions. It was played between Barcelona and SV Werder Bremen, with Barcelona winning 3–2 on aggregate.

Match details

First leg

Second leg

See also
1992 European Cup Final
1992 European Cup Winners' Cup Final
FC Barcelona in international football competitions
SV Werder Bremen in European football

References

External links
UEFA Super Cup
1 games and 2 games – articles from newspapers "El Mundo Deportivo"

1992–93 in European football
1992
SV Werder Bremen matches
FC Barcelona matches
1992
1992
1992–93 in Spanish football
1992–93 in German football
Sports competitions in Barcelona
1990s in Barcelona